Béla Gaál (2 January 1893 – 18 February 1945) was a Hungarian film director. His 1930 film Csak egy kislány van a világon was the first sound film to be made in Hungary.

In 1945 he was interned by the Nazis in Dachau Concentration Camp, where he would die.

Selected filmography
 Csak egy kislány van a világon (1930)
 Vica the Canoeist (1933)
 The New Relative (1934)
 Rotschild leánya (1934)
 Everything for the Woman (1934)
 The Dream Car (1934)
 Az aranyember (1936)
 Hotel Kikelet (1937)
 Modern Girls (1937)

References

Bibliography
 Buranbaeva, Oksana & Mladineo, Vanja. Culture and Customs of Hungary. ABC-CLIO, 2011.
 Burns, Bryan. World Cinema: Hungary. Fairleigh Dickinson University Press, 1996.
 Cunningham, John. Hungarian Cinema: From Coffee House to Multiplex. Wallflower Press, 2004.

External links

1893 births
1945 deaths
Hungarian film directors
Male screenwriters
Hungarian male writers
People from Szabolcs-Szatmár-Bereg County
20th-century Hungarian screenwriters
Hungarian people who died in Dachau concentration camp
Hungarian civilians killed in World War II